General elections were held in the Cook Islands on 2 November 1983. The result was a victory for the Democratic Party, which won 13 of the 24 seats. A coalition government was formed with the opposition Cook Islands Party, with Democratic Party leader Thomas Davis as Prime Minister and CIP leader Geoffrey Henry as Deputy Prime Minister. Henry was later replaced with Terepai Maoate.

Background
In the March 1983 elections, the CIP had won a 13–11 majority in Parliament, resulting in CIP leader Geoffrey Henry becoming Prime Minister. Shortly after the elections, the Democratic Party MP for Atiu lost their seat after a successful petition against the result in the constituency, increasing the CIP majority to three. A court case also began as Henry had failed to resign from office within the first seven days of the parliamentary session and seek re-appointment, as required by the constitution. This was initially viewed as a technicality due to the CIP majority in Parliament. However, in July CIP MP Matapo Matapo died and Tupui Henry left the CIP to sit with the Democratic Party, resulting in an 11–11 tie. The final verdict of the Court of Appeal was announced on 29 July, requiring Henry to resign.

Without a majority, Henry resigned on 2 August. Queen's Representative Gaven Donne convened a series of votes to determine who could attain a parliamentary majority, with the vote on 10 August ending as 11 each for Geoffrey and Tupui Henry. With the Atiu by-election – almost certain to be won by the Democratic Party – due on 12 August, Donne asked the two leaders to wait until the by-election for Matapo's seat before a government was appointed. Tupui Henry and Leader of the Opposition Vincent Ingram agreed in the belief that they could win Matapo's former constituency. However, Geoffrey Henry declined. This resulted in Donne dissolving Parliament on 17 August, calling fresh elections for November, and appointing Geoffrey Henry as caretaker Prime Minister with restricted powers.

Campaign
Prior to the elections, Tupui Henry formed a new party, the Cook Islands Party for Alliance, which put forward seven candidates. The Unity Party nominated three candidates, one of whom withdrew before polling day. Following the elections earlier in the year, the CIP did not publish a new manifesto as its policies had not changed.

Results
Deputy Prime Minister George Ellis and minister Fanaura Kingstone were amongst the incumbent MPs losing their seats.

Aftermath
Following the elections, the result in the constituency of Ruaau was declared void due to treating by an unsuccessful candidate.

References

1983 11
Cook
General
Cook
1983 Cook